John Leighton Nanson (22 September 1863 – 29 February 1916) was a journalist and politician in Western Australia. A former writer and sub-editor with The West Australian, he served in the Legislative Assembly of Western Australia from 1901 to 1905 and again from 1908 to 1914. Nanson was a minister in the governments of Alf Morgans, Walter James, Newton Moore, and Frank Wilson, including as attorney-general from 1909 to 1911.

Early life
Nanson was born in Carlisle, Cumberland, England. He attended Carlisle Grammar School and King William's College (on the Isle of Man). After leaving school, Nanson emigrated to Australia, initially living in Broken Hill, New South Wales, and then going to South Australia. He arrived in Western Australia in the mid-1880s, worked as a journalist. In 1899, he was made an associate editor of The West Australian, having previously served as its Fremantle correspondent.

Politics
Nanson was elected to parliament at the 1901 state election, winning the seat of Murchison from the sitting member, Samuel Mitchell. In November 1901, after only seven months as an MP, he was made Minister for Lands in the newly formed Morgans ministry, which lasted for just 32 days. Nanson was elevated to the ministry for a second time in January 1904, as a minister without portfolio in the James ministry. He replaced Hector Rason as Minister for Works a few months later, but the government fell in August 1904 (after a vote of no confidence).

At the 1904 state election, Nanson had switched seats, defeating Patrick Stone in the seat of Greenough. His old seat, Murchison, was lost to the Labor Party. However, Nanson did not re-contest his seat at the 1905 election, instead travelling to England to study law. He was called to the bar in 1908, and later that year returned to Australia, reclaiming the seat of Greenough at the 1908 state election. Nanson was elevated to the ministry for a third time in May 1909, as a minister without portfolio in the Moore ministry. In a reshuffle the following month, he was made Attorney-General and Minister for Education. He retained his portfolios when Frank Wilson replaced Newton Moore as premier in September 1910, but the government was defeated at the 1911 election.

Later life
Nanson left for England in 1913, and did not re-contest Greenough at the 1914 election. He died in Wimborne, Dorset, in February 1916, aged 52. He had married Janet Drummond Durlacher in 1887, with whom he had three children.

References

|-

|-

1863 births
1916 deaths
Attorneys-General of Western Australia
Australian barristers
Australian newspaper editors
English barristers
English emigrants to Australia
Members of the Western Australian Legislative Assembly
People from Carlisle, Cumbria
People educated at Carlisle Grammar School
People educated at King William's College
19th-century English lawyers